The 2016 San Luis Open Challenger Tour was a professional tennis tournament played on hard courts. It was the 23rd edition of the tournament which was part of the 2016 ATP Challenger Tour. It took place in San Luis Potosí, Mexico between 21 and 27 March.

Singles main-draw entrants

Seeds

 1 Rankings are as of March 14, 2016.

Other entrants
The following players received wildcards into the singles main draw:
  Mauricio Astorga
  Lucas Gómez
  Manuel Sánchez
  Tigre Hank

The following player received entry as an alternate:
  Nicolás Barrientos

The following players received entry from the qualifying draw:
  Marcelo Arévalo
  Robin Staněk
  Agustín Velotti
  Caio Zampieri

Champions

Singles

 Peđa Krstin def.  Marcelo Arévalo, 6–4, 6–2

Doubles

 Marcus Daniell /  Artem Sitak def.  Santiago González /  Mate Pavić, 6–3, 7–6(7–4)

References
 Combined Main Draw

External links
Official Website

San Luis Open Challenger Tour
San Luis Potosí Challenger